Man in the Vault is a 1956 film noir about a locksmith, played by William Campbell, who is forced to help gangsters commit a robbery. The screenplay by Burt Kennedy was based on the novel The Lock and the Key by Frank Gruber. The film was the directorial debut of Andrew V. McLaglen.

Plot
Willis Trent wants to rob the safety deposit box of a crooked Los Angeles businessman, Paul De Camp. He has lawyer Earl Farraday smooth-talk the guy's girlfriend, the two-timing Flo Randall, into revealing the bank box's number.

Now they need a locksmith. A henchman called Herbie is sent to find one. He settles on Tommy Dancer, who works in a bowling alley. Tommy is quickly smitten with Earl's girl Betty Turner, but is a law-abiding citizen and rejects an offer of $5,000. Tommy takes Betty to the Hollywood Bowl and learns she comes from a wealthy family. Tommy's attentions to her get him a beating from Louie, another big thug. He is told Betty's face will be disfigured if he refuses to cooperate.

Breaking into the box is no problem, but Tommy thinks he has been double-crossed by Betty and decides to keep the $200,000. He stashes the cash in a locker at the bowling alley. Flo confesses her part in the scheme to De Camp, who goes after Tommy, even hurling bowling balls at him before the cops show up. Tommy races to save Betty, realizing she is on the level. Trent ends up dead.

Cast
William Campbell as Tommy Dancer
Karen Sharpe as Betty Turner
Anita Ekberg as Flo Randall
Berry Kroger as Willis Trent
Paul Fix as Herbie
James Seay as Paul De Camp
Mike Mazurki as Louie
Robert Keys as Earl Farraday
Nancy Duke as Trent's girlfriend
Gonzales Gonzales as Pedro
John Mitchum as Andy (uncredited)

References

External links

1956 films
1956 crime films
American black-and-white films
American crime films
Batjac Productions films
1950s English-language films
Film noir
Films based on American novels
Films directed by Andrew McLaglen
Films produced by John Wayne
Films set in Los Angeles
American heist films
1956 directorial debut films
1950s American films